Sébastien Atlan (born 14 November 1984) is a French footballer who plays as a defender for Canet Roussillon FC.

External links
Profile at Soccerway
Profile at L'Équipe
Profile at SO Foot

1984 births
Living people
Association football midfielders
French footballers
Amiens SC players
Gap HAFC players
Thonon Evian Grand Genève F.C. players
SO Cassis Carnoux players
FC Villefranche Beaujolais players
SC Toulon players
Canet Roussillon FC players
Championnat National players
Championnat National 2 players
Championnat National 3 players